Gritton is a surname. Notable people with the surname include:

 Bonnie Gritton, American classical pianist
 Martin Gritton (born 1978), Scottish footballer
 Susan Gritton (born 1965), English soprano

See also
 Gritten